Prostanthera monticola, commonly known as Buffalo mint-bush, is a species of flowering plant in the family Lamiaceae and is endemic to higher areas of south-eastern Australia. It is a sprawling, open shrub with red, hairy branches, lance-shaped to narrow elliptic leaves and pale bluish-green to grey-green flowers with dark purple-blue veins.

Description
Flowering occurs in summer.

Taxonomy
Prostanthera monticola was formally described in 1984 by Barry Conn in the Journal of the Adelaide Botanic Gardens, based on plant material collected in 1980 at Crystal Brook Falls, Mount Buffalo in Victoria.

Distribution and habitat
Associated tree species include Eucalyptus delegatensis, E. pauciflora and E. stellulata.

References

monticola
Flora of New South Wales
Flora of Victoria (Australia)
Lamiales of Australia
Plants described in 1984
Taxa named by Barry John Conn